Lisserpeton is an extinct genus of prehistoric salamander of the Hell Creek Formation. Its closest living relatives are the mole salamanders.

Distribution 
Fossils of Lisserpeton have been found in
 Hell Creek Formation, Williston Basin
 Laramie Formation, Colorado
 Kaiparowits Formation, Utah
 Lance Formation, Wyoming

Canada
 Dinosaur Park Formation, Alberta
 Ravenscrag Formation, Saskatchewan

Mexico
 Cerro del Pueblo Formation

See also 
 Prehistoric amphibian
 List of prehistoric amphibians

References 

Prehistoric salamanders
Cretaceous amphibians of North America
Paleocene animals of North America
Cretaceous United States
Hell Creek fauna
Laramie Formation
Cretaceous–Paleogene boundary
Fossils of Canada
Paleontology in Alberta
Paleontology in Saskatchewan
Fossils of Mexico